"Tear Away" is a song by American rock band Drowning Pool, released in 2002 as the second single from their album Sinner.

The single charted in the United States at number 18 and 37 on Billboards Mainstream Rock and Modern Rock charts respectively.

"Tear Away" one of two main themes for the World Wrestling Federation's WrestleMania X8, and the band performed the song at the event. Professional wrestler Kevin Steen also used the song as his entrance theme during his time in Combat Zone Wrestling and Ring of Honor.

Meaning
Dave Williams explained meaning of the song: "Everybody at one time or another in their life needs to say, 'Forget everybody else, I need to deal with me. I need to take care of myself'".

Track listing
CD single #1

CD single #2

Cardsleeve CD single • Vinyl

Austria Promo CD

UK Promo CD

US Promo CD

Charts

Notes

2001 songs
2002 singles
Drowning Pool songs
Wind-up Records singles
Epic Records singles